Karetera Pass is situated in the Western Cape province of South Africa, on the road between Knysna and George

 Driving Skill level: Novice
 Road Condition:  Tarred surface
 Remarks: Rural, tourist traffic, Historic seven passes road

Mountain passes of the Western Cape